Lom Kao is the northernmost district (amphoe) of Phetchabun province, northern Thailand.

History
The first record of Mueang Lom is found in Ram Khamhaeng the Great's stone pillar. In the Rattanakosin era, the area was populated by a large community of Lao people from Vientiane. The population grew due to further immigration from Luang Prabang and Vientiane, so the governor led some people to establish a new town near the Pa Sak River, now in the Lom Sak district.

Geography
Neighboring districts are (from the north clockwise) Dan Sai and Phu Ruea of Loei province and Nam Nao, Lom Sak, and Khao Kho of Phetchabun Province.

Administration

Central administration 
Lom Kao district is divided into nine sub-districts (tambons), which are further subdivided into 99 administrative villages (mubans).

Local administration 
There is one sub-district municipality (thesaban tambon) in the district:
 Lom Kao consisting of parts of sub-district Lom Kao.

There are nine sub-district administrative organizations (SAO) in the district:
 Lom Kao consisting of parts of sub-district, Lom Kao.
 Na Sam consisting of sub-district, Na Sam.
 Hin Hao consisting of sub-district, Hin Hao.
 Ban Noen consisting of sub-district, Ban Noen.
 Sila consisting of sub-district, Sila.
 Na Saeng consisting of sub-district, Na Saeng.
 Wang Ban consisting of sub-district, Wang Ban.
 Na Ko consisting of sub-district, Na Ko.
 Tat Kloi consisting of sub-district, Tat Kloi.

References

External links
amphoe.com (Thai)

Lom Kao